Paul Pender (June 20, 1930 – January 12, 2003), was an American boxer and firefighter from Massachusetts who held the World Middleweight Championship.

Early life
Pender was born in the Boston suburb of Brookline, Massachusetts, the son of William and Anna (Lyster) Pender. A 1949 graduate of Brookline High School, Pender was recruited as an all American football player at Michigan State University and Penn State, but instead, chose to enter professional boxing, while attending Staley College. Although a champion, he regarded boxing as his second job and being a Brookline firefighter his first. As an amateur, he won the New England welterweight championship.

Pender was a member of the United States Marine Corps.

Professional career
In 1959, the National Boxing Association withdrew its recognition of Sugar Ray Robinson as middleweight champion. Gene Fullmer and Carmen Basilio fought for the vacant NBA title, and Fullmer won. Pender beat Robinson, one of the greatest fighters of all time, for the disputed middleweight championship title. He won by split decision in 15 rounds. Pender fought Robinson once again to defend his title and went on to beat him by split decision.

He fought a set of three matches against English boxer Terry Downes, of which only the third (on April 7, 1962) went the full distance. He won the first and the third bout, but the last would prove to be the only fight of that year for Pender and the last of his career. The New York Boxing Commission stripped Pender of his title for not defending it against Dick Tiger. Pender sued and won on appeal.

His career was hampered by his brittle hands. He retired May 7, 1963 as the current world middleweight champion.

His career record was 40 wins (20 by KO), 6 losses, and 2 draws.

Death
He died in Bedford, Massachusetts on January 12, 2003, at the Veterans Administration Hospital.

Professional boxing record

See also
List of middleweight boxing champions

References

External links

 
 

1930 births
2003 deaths
American firefighters
American male boxers
Boxers from Massachusetts
Brookline High School alumni
Sportspeople from Brookline, Massachusetts
United States Marines
Middleweight boxers